The Provincial Assembly of Khyber Pakhtunkhwa is a unicameral legislature of elected representatives of the Pakistani province of Khyber Pakhtunkhwa, which is located in Peshawar, the provincial capital. It was established under Article 106 of the Constitution of Pakistan, having a total of 145 seats, with 115 general seats, 26 seats reserved for women and 4 reserved for non-Muslims. The 11th Provincial Assembly of the Khyber Pakhtunkhwa was dissolved on 18 January 2023, and the province is set to elect a new legislature on 28 May 2023.

Administration

The Federal Government appoints a Governor as head of the Provincial Government, the province is divided into 35 districts. Each district has a Zilla Nazim, in a District the functions are devolved further to the Tehsil, Town and Union Council Governments.

Composition 
After Final Delimitation 2018, the composition of Khyber Pakhtunkhwa Assembly seats are as under:

History 

In 1901 the North West Frontier Province (now Khyber Pakhtunkhwa) was declared as a Chief Commissioner's Province separating it from the Punjab and thirty-one years later in 1932 its status was raised to a Governor's Province and the NORTH WEST FRONTIER PROVINCE (then NWFP) Legislative Assembly was formed. The first president of the council was His Lordship Hon'ble K.B Khan Abdul Ghafoor Khan, Khan of Zaida, who worked in this slot from 1932 till his death in 1936 and was followed by the then deputy president K.B. Abdur Rahim Khan Kundi till the completion of the tenure in 1937. In 1937, the Government of India Act 1935 was enforced in Khyber Pakhtunkhwa (then NWFP) changing the pre set regulations and introduced the portfolio of the chief minister abolishing the portfolio of the president.

This minority government fell shortly afterwards and Dr.Khan Sahib, backed by the Khudai Khidmatgar was elected Chief Minister. His government resigned in 1939 as part of the Indian National Congress's Quit India Movement. The provincial government remained suspended for over three years before a minority government was formed by the Muslim League Sardar Aurangzeb Khan. This government collapsed in 1944 when Dr. Khan Sahib managed to form a government again, before calling an election in 1946.

The Indian National Congress under Dr. Khan Sahib won the 1946 elections despite a strong showing by the Muslim League. The first session of parliament was summoned on 12 March 1946 under the Chairmanship of Sardar Bahadur Khan while Nawabzada Allah Nawaz Khan was elected as Speaker and Lala Girdheri Lal as Deputy Speaker on 13 March 1946. The total number of members was 50, the provincial government of Dr.Khan Sahib was dismissed by the Governor-General in September 1947 after the Chief Minister did not attend the oath taking ceremony of the new nation state of Pakistan. The Muslim league minority Chief Minister Khan Abdul Qayyum Khan formed a government with the help of Jalal-ud-din Jalal Baba. This Assembly was dissolved in 1951 and the number of members was increased from 80 to 85. The Muslim League controversially won the 1951 elections. Then comes names of Nawabzada Allah Nawaz Khan, Nawabzada Nasrullah Khan, Girdhari Lal who occupied the slot during 1947, Khan Muhammad Farid Khan, Malik Amir Alam Khan, Arbab Saifur Rahman who worked two times as deputy speaker, Muhammad Nawaz Khan, Rahim Dad Khan, Ahmad Hassan Khan, Abdul Akbar Khan, Shad Muhammad Khan Khattak, Syed Allaudin and Haji Muhammad Adeel who was the last deputy speaker.

After the creation of Pakistan, the first Election in Khyber Pakhtunkhwa Legislative Council was held on 15 December 1951 and the session of the Assembly was summoned on 10 January 1952 for the oath taking ceremony. Nawabzada Allah Nawaz Khan was again elected as the unopposed Speaker and Khan Muhammad Farid Khan as Deputy Speaker on 10 July 1952.

Following the declaration of One Unit on 3 October 1955, the country was divided into two provinces, West Pakistan and East Pakistan and the Legislative Assembly Building was declared as Peshawar High Court. After the dissolution of West Pakistan in 1970, was restored. The legislative Assembly was restored as a Provincial Assembly through a presidential order known as legal framework order 1970.

After the restoration of the Provincial Assembly in 1970, General Elections were held for Khyber Pakhtunkhwa Provincial Assembly on 17 December 1970. At that time the number of member’s seats in the Assembly was 43 out of which 2 seats were reserved for women and only one for minorities. The first session of the Assembly was summoned on 2 May 1972 in the hall of Pakistan Academy for Rural Development, University Town Peshawar. Muhammad Aslam Khan Khattak was elected as Speaker and Arbab Saifur Rehman Khan as Deputy Speaker on 2 May 1972, and opposition leader Mufti Mahmud was elected Chief Minister as part of an alliance between his party the Jamiat Ulema-e-Islam and the National Awami Party (Wali). His government collectively resigned in protest against the dismissal of the Balochistan provincial government. After some political wrangling a minority government was formed by the Pakistan Peoples Party under Sardar Inayatullah Khan Gandapur, he was subsequently replaced by Nasrullah Khan Khattak. The provincial elections in 1977 were boycotted by the opposition Pakistan National Alliance, a short-lived government was formed under Chief Minister Muhammad Iqbal Khan Jadoon.

On 5 July 1977 Martial Law was declared and the Provincial Assembly was dissolved. The 1985 elections were held on non-party basis on 28 February 1985. The first session of the Assembly was summoned on 12 March 1985 for the oath taking ceremony. Raja Amanullah Khan and Mr. Ahmad Hassan were elected as Speaker and Deputy Speaker on 14 March 1985 and Arbab Jehangir Khan was elected Chief Minister. The Assembly Secretariat shifted from Pakistan Academy for Rural Development to its own present building in 1987.

Qualification of members
According to Article 113 of the Constitution, the qualifications for membership in the National Assembly set forth in Article 62 of the Constitution also apply for membership to the Provincial Assembly. Thus, a member of the Provincial Assembly:
 must be a citizen of Khyber-Pukhtunkhwa;
 must be at least twenty-five years of age and must be enrolled as a voter in any electoral roll in–
 any part of Khyber-Pukhtunkhwa, for election to a general seat or a seat reserved for non-Muslims; and
 any area in Khyber-Pukhtunkhwa from which the member seeks membership for election to a seat reserved for women.
 must be of good character and not commonly known as one who violates Islamic injunctions;
 must have adequate knowledge of Islamic teachings and practices obligatory duties prescribed by Islam as well as abstains from major sins;
 must be sagacious, righteous, non-profligate, and honest; 
 must have never been convicted for a crime involving moral turpitude or for giving false evidence;
 must have never, after the establishment of Pakistan, worked against the integrity of the country or opposed the ideology of Pakistan.

The disqualifications specified in paragraphs 3 and 4 do not apply to a person who is a non-Muslim, but such a person must have good moral reputation and possess other qualifications prescribed by an act of Parliament.

Disqualification of members
The criteria for disqualification of members of a Provincial Assembly is established by Articles 63, 63A, 113 and 127. A person shall be disqualified from being elected or chosen as, and from being, a member of the Provincial Assembly if the member:
 is of unsound mind and has been so declared by a competent court; or
 is an undischarged insolvent; or
 ceases to be a citizen of Khyber-Pukhtunkhwa, Pakistan or acquires the citizenship of a foreign State; or
 holds an office of profit in the service of Pakistan other than an office declared by law not to disqualify its holder; or
 is in the service of any statutory body of any body which is owned or controlled by the Government or in which the Government has a controlling share or interest; or
 is propagating any opinion, or acting in any manner, prejudicial to the Ideology of Pakistan, or the sovereignty, integrity or security of Pakistan, or morality, or the maintenance of public order, or the integrity or independence of the judiciary of Pakistan, or which defames or brings into ridicule the judiciary or the Armed Forces of Pakistan; or
 has been convicted by a court of competent jurisdiction on a charge of corrupt practice, moral turpitude or misuse of power or authority under any law for the time being in force; or
 he has been dismissed from the service of Pakistan or service of a corporation or office set up or controlled by the Provincial Government or a Local Government on the grounds of misconduct or moral turpitude; or
 has been removed or compulsorily retired from the service of Pakistan or service of a corporation or office set up or controlled by the Provincial Government or a Local Government on the grounds of misconduct or moral turpitude; or
 has been in the service of Pakistan or of any statutory body or any body which is owned or controlled by the Government or in which the Government has a controlling share or interest, unless a period of two years has elapsed since he ceased to be in such service; or
 is found guilty of a corrupt or illegal practice under any law for the time being in force, unless a period of five years has elapsed from the date on which that order takes effect; or
 has been convicted under section 7 of the Political Parties Act, 1962 (III of 1962), unless a period of five years has elapsed from the date of such conviction; or
 whether by himself or by any person or body of persons in trust for him or for his benefit or on his account or as a member of a Hindu undivided family, has any share or interest in a contract, not being a contract between a cooperative society and Government, for the supply of goods to, or for the execution of any contract or for the performance of any service undertaken by, Government.

Article 63A, which deals with disqualification on grounds of defection, was added to the Constitution in 1997. A member of a Parliamentary Party composed of a single political party defects if the member: 
 resigns from membership of the political party or joins another Parliamentary Party; or 
 votes or abstains from voting in the Provincial Assembly contrary to any direction issued by the Parliamentary Party to which the member belongs, in relations to
 election of the Chief Minister; or
a vote of confidence or a vote of no-confidence; or
 a Money Bill.

Privileges of members
Article 66 read with Article 127 confers freedom of speech on the members of the Provincial Assembly. No member is liable to any proceedings in any court of law in respect of anything said or any vote given by him in Assembly. Similarly no member is liable in respect of any publication which is published under the authority of Provincial Assembly.

However, Article 114 of the Constitution curtails this privilege and prohibits members from discussing conduct of judges of High Court and Supreme Court in the discharge of their duties.

First day proceedings in the Provincial Assembly
(a) Oath of Members. – After general elections, elected members in the first meeting take oath in the form set out in Third Schedule of the Constitution. Article 65 read with Article 127 states "A person elected to a House shall not sit or vote until he has made before the House oath in the form set out in the Third Schedule". Those members who have not taken oath in the first meeting take oath when they attend a meeting for the first time. The first meeting is presided by the outgoing Speaker. Article 53 (8) read with Article 127 says "the Speaker shall continue in his office till the person elected to fill the office by next Assembly enters upon his office."
(b) Election and oath of Speaker and Deputy Speaker. – In addition to oath taking by the members, Provincial Assembly according to Article 108 to the exclusion of any other business, elect from amongst its members a Speaker and a Deputy Speaker. When office of Speaker or Deputy Speaker becomes vacant, in any way, the Assembly elects another member as Speaker or Deputy Speaker.

The elected Speaker and Deputy Speaker according to clause 2 of Article 53 read with Article 127 take oath before the House in the form set out in the Third Schedule.

Summoning and prorogation of Provincial Assemblies
Article 109 authorizes the Governor of the Province to summon Provincial Assembly to meet at such time and place as he thinks fit. Where the Governor summons Assembly he is authorized to prorogue it too. In addition, the Speaker, on a requisition signed by not less than one-fourth of the total membership of the Provincial Assembly, can summon it, at such time and place as he thinks fit, within fourteen days of the receipt of the requisition. Article 54(3) read with Article 127 also empowers the Speaker to prorogue the session where he summons it.

Number of sessions and days during a year
Article 54 (2) and (3) read with article 127 say there are at least three sessions of Provincial Assembly every year, with not more than 120 days intervening between the last sitting of the Assembly in one session and the date appointed for its first sitting in the next session. While clause 'g' of Article 127 read with Proviso to Article 54 provides that Provincial Assembly shall meet for not less than 70 working days in each year.

Duration of Provincial Assembly
The term of Provincial Assembly in Pakistan according to Article 107 is five years unless it is sooner dissolved, from the day of its first meeting and stands dissolved at the expiration of its terms.

Other methods of dissolution of Provincial Assembly
(a) Dissolution of Provincial Assembly on the advice by the Chief Minister. – Under Article 112, clause 1, the Governor of a Province is empowered to dissolve Provincial Assembly if so advised by the Chief Minister. Where the Chief Minister so advises, the Provincial Assembly stands dissolved at the expiration of 48 hours.
(b) Dissolution of Provincial Assembly by the Governor on the approval by the President. – Clause 2 of the same Article again empowers the Governor to dissolve Provincial Assembly subject to the approval of the President, where he is of the opinion, that after having been passed a vote of no confidence against the Chief Minister, there is no other member of the Provincial Assembly to command the confidence of the majority of the members of the Provincial Assembly, in a session of the Provincial Assembly summoned for the purpose.

Executive Authority of a province
Executive Authority is exercised by the Governor and under Article 105, he shall act in accordance with advice of the cabinet or the Chief Minister.

Appointment and ascertainment of Chief Minister
According to clause 2-A of Article 130, the Governor of a Province invites the member of the Provincial Assembly to be the Chief Minister who commands the confidence of the majority of the members of the Provincial Assembly as ascertained in the session of the Assembly summoned for the purpose in accordance with the provisions of the constitution.

Powers and functions of Provincial Assembly
There are three major functions or powers of a Provincial Assembly:
 To make laws (Article 141 and 142 of the Constitution of Pakistan)
 To manage the purse of the province (Article 123 (3))
 To keep checks on the policies and practices of the Government (Article 130)

Limitations
One of the major functions of the Provincial Assembly is to make laws as provided in Article 141 and 142 of the Constitution for conferring of functions upon officers or authorities subordinate to the Provincial Governments, Constitutionally. This function is subject to some limitations.

 Under Article 142, a Provincial Assembly cannot legislate when an emergency is declared in the country.
 A Provincial Assembly cannot make law which is against fundamental rights.
 Principles of policy or rule of law should be the base of each law.
 A law cannot be enacted if it is not in conformity with the injunctions of Islam.
 Under Article 142, the Provincial Assembly cannot legislate on matters which fall in the Federal Legislative List.

Residuary List
The Provincial Assembly has exclusive powers to make law with respect to any matter not enumerated in the Federal Legislative List. Residuary matters are exclusively within Provincial autonomy. From the above, it cannot be extracted that the Province is subordinate to the Federation or Federation is subordinate to Province. In fact, legislative powers are distributed between Federation and Provinces via Article 142. And one institution cannot take over powers of other institution. However, this provincial law making power comes to an end and shifts to the Federation during emergency when declared vide Articles 232, 233 or 234.

List of Assemblies

Manager of purse of Khyber-Pukhtunkhwa
The second important function of the Provincial Assembly of Khyber Pakhtunkhwa under Article 123 (3) is that it acts as a manager or custodian of the purse of Khyber-Pukhtunkhwa.

Provincial Consolidated Fund
No expenditure from the Provincial Consolidated Fund is deemed to be duly authorised unless it is specified in the schedule so authenticated and is laid before the Provincial Assembly. Provincial Assembly exercises checks over executive through control over the Finance. Article 119 provides custody and withdrawal of money from Provincial Consolidated Fund, (defined in Article 118) and public accounts of a Province, unless it is regulated by the Act of the Provincial Assembly.

Annual and supplementary Budget statement
Provisions given under Article 120 dealing with annual budget statement and Article 124 dealing with supplementary budget or excess grant become effective, when it is approved by the Provincial Assembly.

Approval of budgets
Article 122(2) and Article 124 authorise Provincial Assembly to approve or refuse any demand and reduce the amount specified in the demand. Once budget is approved, the Government has no right to deviate from these sanctions. For excess expenditure, Government has to seek regularization from the Assembly. Similarly under Article 88 read with Article 127, accounts and audit reports of the Government are further scrutinized by the public accounts Committee of the Assembly.

To keep checks on the policies and practices of the Government
The significance of Provincial Assembly is that it is a representative institution and keeps checks upon policies, practices and performance of the Government. Article 130 (4) says that the Cabinet shall be collectively responsible to the Provincial Assembly.

Devices of accountability
Issues relating to Public interest are raised by the Members for discussion in the House in the form of questions, adjournment motions, call attention notices, general discussion, resolutions and various Reports.

The Members make the Executive accountable to the legislature through these devices according to the Rules of Procedure of the Provincial Assembly of Khyber-Pukhtunkhwa, 1997.

Members Support Programme
This programme is meant to serve Members of the Provincial Assembly in different areas. They are provided legislative help in drafting private members bills. They are provided useful and informative books. An Internet facility is also available to them, and through Internet research they can polish their ideas.

To provide these facilities to the Members, in 1997 the Research and Reference Division was formed. It was established to provide information to the Members when needed, and to collect up-to-date information from the resources available. The Library and Computer Sections were included in this division. It was also meant to provide help to the representatives in legislative procedures, such as the drafting of a bill. Prior to the establishment of the Research and Reference Wing, this service was performed by the Legislation Branch. Salman Said

Automation Section and Library Section
The primary function of Library Section is to provide data to the Members and to the Research Section. Information such as the Assembly's agenda, date of next sitting, schedule of committee meetings and information about Members is available due to installation of the latest PBX. The Assembly Secretariat has stored vital information in the computer and it is accessible from anywhere around the clock.

Moreover, Research and Reference Division has designed a web page to provide information to the Members about the Assembly Secretariat and proceedings of the Assembly including its schedule and agenda, and a summary of its proceedings. This web page also includes the procedural rules for the Provincial Assembly of Khyber-Pukhtunkhwa and some other important laws of the country.

Elections

Main Article: Elections in Khyber Pakhtunkhwa

In the 2002 elections, Muttahida Majlis-e-Amal had won 53 of the seats, ANP 15, and PPP 10 seats.

2008 Elections
The elections of 2008 resulted in the Awami National Party and Pakistan Peoples Party emerging as the two largest parties at the expense of the conservative Muttahida Majlis-i-Amal.

2013 Elections
The elections of 2013 resulted in the Pakistan Tehreek-e-Insaf emerging as the largest party in the province. The Assembly was dissolved on 28 May 2018 after completing a 5-year term.

2018 Elections

The elections of 2018 resulted in the Pakistan Tehreek-e-Insaf emerging as the largest party in the province.

Election was postponed at two constituencies – PK-78 Peshawar and PK-99 Dera Ismail Khan.
Election results are withheld in one constituency – PK-23 Shangla – where the number of women voters was less than 10 per cent of the total votes.

2019 Elections

After Merger of FATA in Khyber Pakhtunkhwa in 2017. Elections was held across the merged tribal districts on 20 July 2019. 285 candidates ran for elections on 16 general seats of tribal districts. With addition to 16 general seats 4 seats will be reserved for women and 1 for Non-Muslim, increasing the number of assembly seats from 124 to 145. Unofficial results showed that independents won 6, the Pakistan Tehreek-e-Insaf won 5, JUI-F 3, JI and ANP won one each.

See also 
Government of Khyber Pakhtunkhwa
Government of Pakistan
Constitution of Pakistan
Parliament of Pakistan
Senate of Pakistan
National Assembly of Pakistan
Elections in Pakistan
Peshawar
Provincial Assembly of the Punjab
Provincial Assembly of Sindh
Provincial Assembly of Balochistan

References

External links
http://www.pakp.gov.pk
https://web.archive.org/web/20110225010611/http://khyberpakhtunkhwa.gov.pk/

 
K
Government of Khyber Pakhtunkhwa
Khyber Pakhtunkhwa